Salvador Escrihuela Quiles (28 February 1951 – 6 August 2021) was a Spanish professional football player and manager.

Career
Born in Tavernes de la Valldigna, Escrihuela played as a winger for Alzira, Sabadell, Granada, Alavés, and Gandía. He spent seven seasons with Granada over two spells, scoring 39 goals in 215 games.

He managed Dénia in 1991–92 season.

References

1951 births
2021 deaths
Spanish footballers
UD Alzira footballers
CE Sabadell FC footballers
Granada CF footballers
Deportivo Alavés players
CF Gandía players
La Liga players
Segunda División players
Segunda División B players
Association football wingers
Spanish football managers
People from Safor
Sportspeople from the Province of Valencia